Thea Soti (born 3 September 1989, in Subotica, Serbia) is a vocalist, experimental sound artist, and composer.

Biography 
Soti was raised in a Hungarian family in Serbia, where she received classical musical training since her age six. As a classical pianist, she participated successfully in several international competitions. Later she engaged herself with jazz and popular musical styles in Budapest and Berlin. She studied jazz vocals and composition at the Hochschule für Musik, Theater und Medien Hannover, University of Lucerne and Hochschule für Musik und Tanz Köln. Her main focus is working with the human voice as an instrument and combining
structures of free improvisation with open compositions, either for solo, small or large ensembles.

In 2010, she founded her world-music project "Nanaya" with Daniel S. Scholz (Oud), Johannes Keller (Double-Bass) and Jonas Pirzer (Drums), where she sings mostly in Hungarian. She has toured in Germany, Austria, Switzerland, Spain, Portugal, Hungary, Serbia, Czech Republic and Slovakia with different bands, among others with "Manivolanti", "Viktor Bürkland Trio" and "Thea Soti Quartet".,

She is part of the jazz trio "RYMM" with Salim Javaid (Saxophone) and Anthony Greminger (Drums).

She is a founding member of the Sung Sound composer´s collective, which initiates cooperation between young and up-coming vocalist-composers and European big bands. She is also known as a composer working with large ensembles (Modern Art Orchestra, DDSSBB, Subway Jazz Orchestra, Fette Hupe, Cherry Tree Orchestra, Tonhallen Orchestra, etc.).

In 2014, Soti won the 2nd prize of the international big band composing competition JazzComp Graz.

Discography 

 with Stijn Demuynck, Leonhard Huhn, Raphael Malfliet
 Pouancé (2016)
 with NaNaya
 far.home.east (2016, quadratisch rekords)

 with Mascha Corman & Salim Javaid
 Monsters For Breakfast (2016, Creative Sources Recordings)

 with Die Daniel Sebastian Scholz Big Band
 DDSSBB (2015, quadratisch rekords)

 with Adam Gallina, Tivadar Nemesi, Paul Schwingenschlögl
 Hang Caravan (2012, Morgenland)

References

External links 

Official website

Musicians from Subotica
1989 births
Living people
21st-century Serbian women singers
21st-century Hungarian women singers